Easter Stockings (foaled 1925) was an American Thoroughbred Champion racehorse. Bred by brothers Montfort and B. B. Jones, who made a fortune in the oil business in Oklahoma, she was foaled at their Audley Farm in Berryville, Virginia. She was out of the mare, Irish Lassie, a daughter Celt, the 1921 leading sire in North America. Her sire was Sir Barton, a U.S. Racing Hall of Fame inductee and the first horse to ever win the U.S. Triple Crown series.

Raced under the banner of Audley Farm Stable, Easter Stockings was trained by Kay Spence. A winner at two, in 1928 Easter Stockings won the Kentucky and Latonia Oaks en route to earning American Champion Three-Year-Old Filly honors. At age four she returned to the track and won several good races including events against her male counterparts.

References

 Easter Stockings' pedigree and partial racing stats
 June 19, 1928 New York Times article titled Easter Stockings Wins At Latonia
 Information on the Jones family in Bristow Oklahoma

1925 racehorse births
Racehorses bred in Virginia
Racehorses trained in the United States
Kentucky Oaks winners
Thoroughbred family 2-o